Mahesh Narayanan (born 2 May 1982) is an Indian film director, screenwriter, editor and cinematographer who predominantly works in Malayalam cinema, he has also worked in Tamil and Hindi films. He is a recipient of the Kerala State Film Award for Best Debut Director (2017).

He is best known for his editing in Vishwaroopam and Vishwaroopam II, directed by Kamal Haasan. His best works as a director include Take Off (2017); which got a special mention in the 65th National Film Awards, C U Soon (2020) and Malik (2021).

Career 
After completing his graduation from University College Thiruvananthapuram; he joined M.G.R. Government Film and Television Training Institute in Tamil Nadu after which he started working as an advert editor. He subsequently progressed to editing documentaries, short films and entered the film industry with Rathri Mazha, a Malayalam film which won five Kerala State Film Awards.

A few of his most popular films as an editor includes Beautiful, Traffic, Kanyaka Talkies, Viswaroopam, and Ennu Ninte Moideen. After establishing himself as an accomplished and successful editor, Mahesh ventured into writing and made his debut as a writer with 2015 Malayalam film Mili, which opened to rave reviews in Kerala.

In 2017 Mahesh Narayanan progressed into film-making directing his debut feature Take Off, a 2017 Indian drama thriller film, based on the ordeal of Indian nurses in the city of Tikrit, Iraq, in 2014 with Parvathy Thiruvothu, Kunchacko Boban and Fahadh Faasil starring in the lead roles. It is written by Mahesh Narayanan and P. V. Shajikumar. The film was shot in various parts of Dubai and Kerala. Take Off was released on 24 March 2017. The film was a blockbuster at the box office grossing ₹40 crore and running for over 125 days in theaters. The film was in the competition section at various international festivals, including International Film Festival of India and International Film Festival of Kerala. The film won a Special Jury Award at the 48th International Film Festival of India. The film won five Kerala State Awards including the Best Debut Director's Award for Mahesh Narayanan.

In June 2020, Mahesh Narayanan announced that his next venture would be en experimental one titled C U Soon, starring Fahadh Faasil in a lead role. Mahesh described the film as a small exercise using an iPhone rather than a feature film. It was also revealed that the film would be about 60–65 minutes (the final release time amounted to 1h 38min) in length, and shot in Faasil's flat. Although the film got approval from the Film Employees Federation of Kerala (FEFKA), the Kerala Film Producers Association (KFPA) was opposed to the shoot with regards to the disruptions caused by the COVID-19 pandemic. Despite this, filming was successfully completed on 21 August. Upon its OTT release in Amazon prime Video the film received positive reviews from the critics. It is India's first computer screen film. C U Soon was screened under the category of screen-life at the 42nd Moscow International Film Festival

Personal life
Mahesh Narayanan was born in Thiruvananthapuram to Dr. Geetha and Narayanan. He has a younger brother. He is married to Ramya and has one daughter.

Awards 
 Special Jury, Silver Peacock Award at IFFI 2017
 65th National Film Awards, Special Mention for Take Off
 Kerala State Film Award for Best Debut Director
 Best Screenplay Award at SCO Film Festival, Qingdao, China
 Audience Choice Award at Indian Film Festival of Los Angeles, Los Angeles, 2018
 Vanitha Film Awards 2018 – Best Movie – Take Off
 Asiavision Award 2017 for the Best Director – Take Off
 Asianet Film Award 2018 for Best Director – Take Off
 Asianet Film Awards 2015 for Best Editor – Ennu Ninte Moideen
 9th South Indian International Movie Awards for Best Director – C U Soon
 10th South Indian International Movie Awards for Best Director – Malik

Filmography

References

External links 
 

Film directors from Thiruvananthapuram
Malayalam film directors
Living people
Screenwriters from Thiruvananthapuram
21st-century Indian film directors
Indian documentary film editors
Film editors from Kerala
1982 births